Mekong Aviation Joint Stock Company, doing business as Air Mekong, was an airline from Vietnam which operated scheduled passenger flights from its base at Phu Quoc Airport and secondary hubs at Noi Bai International Airport and Tan Son Nhat International Airport. Its headquarters were located in Phú Quốc, Kiên Giang Province. It was established in 2009 and flight operations were launched on 9 October 2010. This is the third privately owned airline of Vietnam, after Indochina Airlines (defunct as of 2009), and VietJet Air. Air Mekong leased four Bombardier CRJ 900 aircraft from SkyWest Airlines, each equipped with 90 seats in both business and economy classes. In 2011, Air Mekong operated 10,750 flights and carried about 710 thousand passengers.

Air Mekong is a member of BIM Group. Other shareholders are SkyWest, Inc. and Eximbank.

Destinations
As of August 2011, Air Mekong offers scheduled flights to the following destinations across Vietnam:
All these routes have been suspended since 1 March 2013 until the airline changes their fleet.  The date of resumption of service has not been announced.

As of January 2015, the license has been revoked following extended dormancy.

Fleet 
Air Mekong leased four Bombardier CRJ 900 aircraft from SkyWest Airlines equipped with 90 seats in both business and economy class.

Corporate affairs
Air Mekong has its corporate headquarters in Phú Quốc, Kiên Giang Province. Air Mekong maintains its Hanoi branch on the third floor of the Syrena Tower (tòa nhà Syrena) in Tay Ho, Hanoi. The Hanoi office houses the Commerce and Services Department, including the PR & Advertising Division.

See also

Indochina Airlines
Pacific Airlines
Transport in Vietnam
VietJet Air

References

External links

Air Mekong
Air Mekong 

Defunct airlines of Vietnam
Airlines established in 2009
Airlines disestablished in 2013
2009 establishments in Vietnam
Airlines disestablished in 2009
2013 disestablishments in Vietnam